Cameraria wislizeniella is a moth of the family Gracillariidae. It is known from California, United States.

The length of the forewings is 2.4-4.7 mm.

The larvae feed on Quercus agrifolia, Quercus wislizeni and Quercus wislizeni var. frutescens. They mine the leaves of their host plant. The mine is oblong to ovoid, occasionally circular. The epidermis is opaque, green yellow. Mines usually cross the midrib. They are solitary, there is usually only one mine per leaf, usually with a single fold, but occasionally two folds.

References

Cameraria (moth)

Moths of North America
Moths described in 1971
Lepidoptera of the United States
Fauna of California
Leaf miners
Taxa named by Paul A. Opler